Brian Gray (born 21 February 1938) is a former Australian rules footballer who played for Collingwood in the Victorian Football League (VFL) during the late 1950s and early 1960s.

Gray usually played as a wingman but could also rove and play at half forward. He was a member of Collingwood's 1958 premiership team and played in a losing Grand Final in 1960. In the 1962 Brownlow Medal count he polled well with an equal sixth-place finish and represented the Victorian interstate side in both 1961 and 1962.

See also
 Australian football at the 1956 Summer Olympics

References

Holmesby, Russell and Main, Jim (2007). The Encyclopedia of AFL Footballers. 7th ed. Melbourne: Bas Publishing.

1938 births
Australian rules footballers from Victoria (Australia)
Collingwood Football Club players
Collingwood Football Club Premiership players
Coleraine Football Club players
Living people
Australian footballers at the 1956 Summer Olympics
One-time VFL/AFL Premiership players